1,2-Diazepine is a seven-membered heterocyclic compound with two nitrogen atoms (e.g., in ring positions 1 and 2) and three double bonds.

See also
 Azepine

External links
 Pubchem

Diazepines